Krutovo is a rural locality (a village) in Denisovskoye Rural Settlement, Gorokhovetsky District, Vladimir Oblast, Russia. The population was 247 as of 2010. There are 2 streets.

Geography 
Krutovo is located 27 km west of Gorokhovets (the district's administrative centre) by road. Mitino is the nearest rural locality.

References 

Rural localities in Gorokhovetsky District